Markus Soomets (born 2 March 2000) is an Estonian professional footballer who plays as a midfielder for Meistriliiga club Flora.

Club career
On 17 January 2020, he returned from Italy to Estonia and signed a 3-year contract with Flora.

International career
He made his debut for Estonia national football team on 11 November 2020 in a friendly game against Italy. He played the full game.

References

External links

2000 births
Living people
Sportspeople from Tartu
Estonian footballers
Association football midfielders
Esiliiga players
Meistriliiga players
Tartu JK Tammeka players
FC Flora players
Serie C players
Estonia youth international footballers
Estonia under-21 international footballers
Estonia international footballers
Estonian expatriate footballers
Expatriate footballers in Italy
Estonian expatriate sportspeople in Italy